Waxman, or alternatively Wachsmann, is a surname. Notable people with the surname include:

Al Waxman (1935–2001), Canadian actor
Alois Wachsman (1898–1942), Czech painter and architect
Bedřich Wachsmann (1820–1897), Czech painter and architect
Chaim I. Waxman (born 1941), sociologist
Daniel Wachsmann (born 1946), Israeli filmmaker, producer, and director
David Waxman, DJ, remixer and producer
Franz Waxman (1906–1967), composer
Harry Waxman (1912–1984), English cinematographer
Henry Waxman (born 1939), U.S. Representative
Jiří Voskovec (Wachsmann) (1905–1981), Czech-US actor
Jonathan Waxman (born 1950), American chef
Keoni Waxman (born 1968), American film director
Klaus Wachsmann (1907–1984), ethnomusicologist
Konrad Wachsmann (1901–1980), architect
Matthew Waxman (born ca. 1972), American law professor and author
Michael Waxman, American film and television director
Meyer Waxman (1887–1969), rabbi and scholar
Mordecai Waxman (1917–2002), Conservative rabbi
Murray Waxman (1925–2022), Canadian basketball player
Nachshon Wachsman (1975–1994), Israeli soldier
Nikolaus Wachsmann (born 1971), German historian
Seth P. Waxman (born 1951), U.S. Solicitor General
Sharon Waxman (born c.1963), American journalist
Sidney Waxman (1923–2005), American horticulturist and educator
Stan Waxman (1922–2013), American basketball player
Stephen Waxman (born 1945), American neurologist and neuroscientist

See also 
Waxman Committee, named after Henry Waxman
Waxman report, named after Henry A. Waxman
Hatch-Waxman Act
om Hatch Waxman Exemption
Waxman-Markey (Bill)
Waxman-Geschwind syndrome
Waksman
Wachsmann

Jewish surnames
German-language surnames

cs:Wachsmann